Iry-Hor (or Ro) was a predynastic pharaoh of Upper Egypt during the 32nd century BC. Excavations at Abydos in the 1980s and 1990s and the discovery in 2012 of an inscription of Iry-Hor in the Sinai confirmed his existence. Iry-Hor is the earliest ruler of Egypt known by name and is sometimes cited as the earliest-living historical person known by name.

Name 
Iry-Hor's name is written with the Horus falcon hieroglyph (Gardiner sign G5) above a mouth hieroglyph (Gardiner D21). While the modern reading of the name is "Iry-Hor", Flinders Petrie, who discovered and excavated Iry-Hor's tomb at the end of the 19th century, read it "Ro", which was the usual reading of the mouth hieroglyph at the time. 

Given the archaic nature of the name, the translation proved difficult and, in the absence of a better alternative, Ludwig D. Morenz proposed that the literal translation be retained, giving "Horus mouth".

In the 1990s, Werner Kaiser and Günter Dreyer translated Iry-Hor's name as "Companion of Horus". 

Toby Wilkinson translated the signs as "Property of the king".

The Egyptologists Jürgen von Beckerath and Peter Kaplony proposed that the known inscriptions referred to a private person whose name is to be read Wer-Ra, wr-rꜣ (lit. "great mouth"), i.e. reading the bird above the mouth-sign as the swallow hieroglyph G36 rather than the Horus falcon. They translated the name as "Spokesman" or "Chief".

Identity

Controversy regarding his social status
Until 2012, the name of Iry-Hor had not been found in or next to a serekh, so the identification of Iry-Hor as a king was controversial. Toby Wilkinson contended that Iry-Hor was not a king, but a slave of a king. Egyptologists Jürgen von Beckerath and Peter Kaplony also initially rejected the identification of Iry-Hor as a king and proposed instead that the known inscriptions refer to a private person whose name is to be read Wer-Ra, wr-rꜣ (lit. "great mouth"), i.e. reading the bird above the mouth-sign as the swallow hieroglyph G36 rather than the Horus falcon. They translated the name as "Spokesman" or "Chief".

Egyptologists Flinders Petrie, Laurel Bestock and Jochem Kahl nonetheless believed that he was indeed a real ruler. 

Following the  excavations at Abydos and the discovery of an inscription of Iry-Hor in the Sinai in 2012, Wilkinson's hypothesis is now rejected by most Egyptologists and Iry-Hor is widely accepted as a predynastic king of Egypt.

Resolution
Günter Dreyer's excavations of the necropolis of Abydos revealed that Iry-Hor was in fact well attested there with over 27 objects bearing his name and that his tomb was of royal proportions.
Furthermore, in 2012 an inscription mentioning Iry-Hor was discovered in the Sinai, the inscription comprising furthermore an archaic empty serekh on the right of Iry-Hor's name. The inscription mentions the city of Memphis, pushing back its foundation to before Narmer and establishing that Iry-Hor was already reigning over it. Following this discovery, most Egyptologists, including G. Dreyer and the discoverers of the inscription, Pierre Tallet and Damien Laisney, now believe that Iry-Hor was indeed a king. 
Continuing excavations of Iry-Hor's tomb at Abydos by Günter Dreyer established that the tomb was of similar dimensions and layout as those of Ka and Narmer and must, therefore, have belonged to a king. This was consequently accepted by von Beckerath and Iry-Hor is now the first entry in the latest edition of von Beckerath's Handbook of Egyptian Pharaohs.

Reign and attestations

Iry-Hor was most likely Ka's immediate predecessor and thus would have reigned during the early 32nd century BC. He probably ruled from Hierakonpolis over Abydos and the wider Thinite region and controlled Egypt at least as far north as Memphis, since the Sinai rock inscription relates a visit of Iry-Hor to this city. The Egyptologists      Tallet and Damien Laisney further propose that Iry-Hor also controlled parts of the Nile Delta.

He was buried in the royal cemetery of Umm el-Qa'ab near Ka, Narmer and the First Dynasty kings. Iry-Hor's name appears on clay vessels from his tomb in Abydos and a clay seal with the hieroglyphs for r-Ḥr was found in Narmer's tomb and may refer to Iry-Hor. In total no less than 22 pottery jars incised with Iry-Hor's name have been in Abydos as well as at least 5 ink-inscribed fragments and a cylinder seal.
A similar seal was also found far to the north in the tomb Z 401 of Zawyet el'Aryan in Lower Egypt. An incision on a spindle whorl found in Hierakonpolis during James E. Quibell and Petrie excavations there in 1900 may refer to him. Finally, the discovery of a rock inscription of Iry-Hor in the Sinai constitutes his northernmost attestation. The inscription shows the name of Iry-Hor on a boat, next to the word Inebu-hedj meaning "white walls", the ancient name of Memphis.

Tomb

Iry-Hor's tomb is the oldest tomb of the Abydos necropolis B in the Umm el-Qa'ab. It comprises two separate underground chambers B1 and B2 excavated by Petrie in 1899 and later by Werner Kaiser. A further chamber, now known as "B0", was uncovered during re-excavations of Iry-Hor's tomb in the 1990s. These chambers have a size similar to those found in the tombs of Ka and Narmer. No superstructure, if there ever was one, survives to this day. Chamber B1 yielded jar fragments incised with his name. Chamber B2 produced another incised jar fragment, a seal impression, several ink inscriptions and vessel fragments bearing the names of Ka and Narmer. Parts of a bed were also found onsite.

See also
Naqada III, also called Dynasty 0
Kushim

References

External links
 On the predynastic dynasty 0
 King Iry-Hor
 Iry-Hor
 Tomb of Iry-Hor

32nd-century BC Pharaohs
2012 archaeological discoveries
Year of birth unknown
Year of death unknown